A kurgan is a type of tumulus constructed over a grave, often characterized by containing a single human body along with grave vessels, weapons and horses. Originally in use on the Pontic–Caspian steppe, kurgans spread into much of Central Asia and Eastern, Southeast, Western and Northern Europe during the 3rd millennium BC.

The earliest kurgans date to the 4th millennium BC in the Caucasus, and a part of researchers associate these with the Indo-Europeans. Kurgans were built in the Eneolithic, Bronze, Iron, Antiquity and Middle Ages, with ancient traditions still active in Southern Siberia and Central Asia.

Etymology
According to the Etymological dictionary of the Ukrainian language the word "kurhan" is borrowed directly from the "Polovtsian" language (Kipchak, part of the Turkic languages) and means: fortress, embankment, high grave. The word has two possible etymologies, either from the Old Turkic root qori- "to close, to block, to guard, to protect", or qur- "to build, to erect, furnish or stur". According to Vasily Radlov it may be a cognate to qorγan, meaning "fortification, fortress or a castle".

The Russian noun, already attested in Old East Slavic, comes from an unidentified Turkic language. Kurgans are mounds of earth and stones raised over a grave or graves. Popularised by its use in Soviet archaeology, the word is now widely used for tumuli in the context of Eastern European and Central Asian archaeology.

Origins and spread
Some spectre graves could have been covered with a tumulus, placing the first kurgans as early as the 5th millennium BC in eastern Europe. However, this hypothesis is not unanimous. 
 
Kurgans were used in Ukrainian and Russian steppes, their use spreading with migration into southern, central, and northern Europe in the 3rd millennium BC.
Later, Kurgan barrows became characteristic of Bronze Age peoples, and have been found from Mongolia, Kazakhstan, the Altay Mountains, the Caucasus, Russia, Ukraine, Belarus, Romania, and Bulgaria (Thracians).

Kurgan hypothesis 

The Kurgan hypothesis is that Proto-Indo-Europeans were the bearers of the Kurgan culture of the Black Sea and the Caucasus and west of the Urals. Introduced by Marija Gimbutas in 1956, it combines kurgan archaeology with linguistics to locate the origins of the peoples who spoke the Proto-Indo-European language. She tentatively named the culture "Kurgan" after its distinctive burial mounds and traced its diffusion into Europe. The hypothesis has had a significant impact on Indo-European studies.

Scholars who follow Gimbutas identify a "Kurgan culture" as reflecting an early Proto-Indo-European ethnicity that existed in the steppes and in southeastern Europe from the 5th millennium to the 3rd millennium BC. In Kurgan cultures, most burials were in kurgans, either clan or individual. Most prominent leaders were buried in individual kurgans, now called "royal kurgans". More elaborate than clan kurgans and containing grave goods, royal kurgans have attracted the most attention and publicity.

Scythian-Saka-Siberian monuments
The monuments of these cultures coincide with Scythian-Saka-Siberian monuments. Scythian-Saka-Siberian monuments have common features, and sometimes common genetic roots. Also associated with these spectacular burial mounds are the Pazyryk, an ancient people who lived in the Altai Mountains lying in Siberian Russia on the Ukok Plateau, near the borders with China, Kazakhstan and Mongolia. The archaeological site on the Ukok Plateau associated with the Pazyryk culture is included in the Golden Mountains of Altai UNESCO World Heritage Site.

Scythian-Saka-Siberian classification includes monuments from the 8th to the 3rd century BC. This period is called the Early or Ancient Nomads epoch. "Hunnic" monuments date from the 3rd century BC to the 6th century AD, and Turkic ones from the 6th century AD to the 13th century AD, leading up to the Mongolian epoch.

Cultural influence

The tradition of kurgan burials was adopted by some neighboring peoples who did not have such a tradition. Various Thracian kings and chieftains were buried in elaborate mound tombs found in modern Bulgaria; Philip II of Macedon, the father of Alexander the Great, was buried in a kurgan in present Greece; and Midas, a king of ancient Phrygia, was buried in a kurgan near his ancient capital of Gordion.

Usage

Architecture
Burial mounds are complex structures with internal chambers. Within the burial chamber at the heart of the kurgan, elite individuals were buried with grave goods and sacrificial offerings, sometimes including horses and chariots. The structures of the earlier Neolithic period from the 4th to the 3rd millenniums BC, and Bronze Age until the 1st millennium BC, display continuity of the archaic forming methods. They were inspired by common ritual-mythological ideas.

Common components

In all periods, the development of the kurgan structure tradition in the various ethnocultural zones is revealed by common components or typical features in the construction of the monuments. They include:

 funeral chambers
 tombs
 surface and underground constructions of different configurations
 a mound of earth or stone, with or without an entrance
 funeral, ritual, and other traits
 the presence of an altar in the chamber
 stone fence
 moat
 bulwark
 the presence of an entryway into the chamber, into the tomb, into the fence, or into the kurgan
 the location of a sacrificial site on the embankments, inside the mound, inside the moat, inside the embankments, and in their links, entryways, and around the kurgan
 the location of a fire pit in the chamber
 a wooden roof over or under the kurgan, at the top of the kurgan, or around the kurgan
 the location of stone statues, columns, poles and other objects; bypass passages inside the kurgan, inside tombs, or around the kurgan
 funeral paths from the moat or bulwark.

Depending on the combination of these elements, each historical and cultural nomadic zone has certain architectural distinctions.

Pre-Scythian-Saka-Sibirian kurgans (Bronze Age)
In the Bronze Age, kurgans were built with stone reinforcements. Some of them are believed to be Scythian burials with built-up soil, and embankments reinforced with stone (Olhovsky, 1991).

Pre-Scythian-Saka-Sibirian kurgans were surface kurgans. Wooden or stone tombs were constructed on the surface or underground and then covered with a kurgan. The kurgans of Bronze culture across Europe and Asia were similar to housing; the methods of house construction were applied to the construction of the tombs. Kurgan Ak-su - Aüly (12th–11th centuries BC) with a tomb covered by a pyramidal timber roof under a kurgan has space surrounded by double walls serving as a bypass corridor. This design has analogies with Begazy, Sanguyr, Begasar, and Dandybay kurgans. These building traditions survived into the early Middle Ages, to the 8th–10th centuries AD.

The Bronze Pre-Scythian-Saka-Sibirian culture developed in close similarity with the cultures of Yenisei, Altai, Kazakhstan, southern, and southeast Amur regions.

Some kurgans had facing or tiling. One tomb in Ukraine has 29 large limestone slabs set on end in a circle underground. They were decorated with carved geometrical ornamentation of rhombuses, triangles, crosses, and on one slab, figures of people.  Another example has an earthen kurgan under a wooden cone of thick logs topped by an ornamented cornice up to 2 m in height.

Scythian-Saka-Sibirian kurgans (Early Iron Age)

The Scythian-Saka-Sibirian kurgans in the Early Iron Age have grandiose mounds throughout the Eurasia] continent.

Gender
Females were buried in about 20% of graves of the lower and middle Volga river region during the Yamna and Poltavka cultures. Two thousand years later, females dressed as warriors were buried in the same region. David Anthony notes, "About 20% of Scythian – Sarmatian "warrior graves" on the lower Don and lower Volga contained females dressed for battle as if they were men, a phenomenon that probably inspired the Greek tales about the Amazons."
A near-equal ratio of male-to-female graves was found in the eastern Manych steppes and Kuban–Azov steppes during the Yamna culture. In Ukraine, the ratio was intermediate between the other two regions.

Archaeological remains
The most obvious archeological remains associated with the Scythians are the great burial mounds, some over 20 m high, which dot the Ukrainian and Russian steppe belts and extend in great chains for many kilometers along ridges and watersheds. From them much has been learnt about Scythian life and art.

Excavated kurgans 
Some excavated kurgans include:
 The Ipatovo kurgan revealed a long sequence of burials from the Maykop culture c. 4000 BC down to the burial of an elite woman of the 3rd century BC, excavated 1998–99.
 Kurgan 4 at Kutuluk near Samara, Russia, dated to c. 24th century BC, contains the skeleton of a man, estimated to have been 35 to 40 years old and about 152 cm tall. Resting on the skeleton's bent left elbow was a copper object 65 cm long with a blade of a diamond-shaped cross-section and sharp edges, but no point, and a handle, originally probably wrapped in leather.  No similar object is known from Bronze Age Eurasian steppe cultures.
 The Maikop kurgan dates to the 3rd millennium BC.
 The Novovelichkovskaya kurgan of c. 2000 BC on the Ponura River, Krasnodar region, southern Russia, contains the remains of 11 people, including an embracing couple, buried with bronze tools, stone carvings, jewelry, and ceramic vessels decorated with red ocher. The tomb is associated with the Novotitorovka culture nomads.
 The Kostromskaya kurgan of the 7th century BC produced a famous Scythian gold stag (now Hermitage Museum), next to the iron shield it decorated.  Apart from the principal male body with his accoutrements, the burial included thirteen humans with no adornment above him, and around the edges of the burial twenty-two horses were buried in pairs. It was excavated by N. I. Veselovski in 1897.
 The Issyk kurgan, in southern Kazakhstan, contains a skeleton, possibly female, c. 4th century BC, with an inscribed silver cup, gold ornaments, Scythian animal art objects and headdress reminiscent of Kazakh bridal hats; discovered in 1969.
 Kurgan 11 of the Berel cemetery, in the Bukhtarma River valley of Kazakhstan, contains a tomb of c. 300 BC, with a dozen sacrificed horses preserved with their skin, hair, harnesses, and saddles intact, buried side by side on a bed of birch bark next to a funeral chamber containing the pillaged burial of two Scythian nobles; excavated in 1998.
 The Tovsta Mohyla Kurgan belongs to the 4th century BC and was excavated in 1971 by the Ukrainian archaeologist Boris M. Mozolevsky. It contained the famous Golden Pectoral from Tovsta Mohyla that is now in exhibition in the Museum of Historical Treasures of Ukraine, which is located inside the Kyiv Pechersk Lavra, in Kyiv. This pectoral is the most famous artwork connected with the Scythians. A beautiful sword scabbard was found in the same burial pre-chamber, which was never robbed, differently from the main chamber. A second lateral burial was found intact in the same Kurgan. It belonged to a woman and her 2-year old baby girl, both very likely related to the man buried at the center of the Kurgan. She was found covered with gold, including a golden diadem and other fine golden jewels. The Tovsta Mohyla Kurgan, 60 m in diameter before the excavation, is located in present-day southern Ukraine near the city of Pokrov in the Dnipro region.
 The Ryzhanovka kurgan, a  kurgan 125 km south of Kyiv, Ukraine, containing the tomb of a Scythian chieftain, 3rd century BC, was excavated in 1996.
 The Solokha kurgan, in the Zaporizhzhia Oblast of Ukraine, Scythian, dates to the early 4th century BC.
 Mamai-gora, kurgan on the banks of Kakhovka Reservoir south west of Enerhodar (near the village of Velyka Znam'yanka).  Known as one of the biggest tumulus in Europe.  The height of the kurgan is 80 meters.  Here were found remains of people from Bronze Age, Scythians, Sarmatians, Cimmerians and Nogai people. 
 The Thracian Tomb of Kazanlak, near the town of Kazanlak in central Bulgaria, is a Thracian kurgan of c. the 4th century BC.
 The Aleksandrovo kurgan is a Thracian kurgan of c. the 4th century BC.
 The Thracian Tomb of Sveshtari, Bulgaria, is a Thracian kurgan of c. the 3rd century BC.
 The Håga Kurgan, located on the outskirts of Uppsala, Sweden, is a large Nordic Bronze Age kurgan from c. 1000 BC.
 The Pereshchepina Kurgan is a burial memorial of the Bulgarian ruler Kubrat from c. AD 660.
 Noin-Ula kurgan, located by the Selenga River in the northern Mongolia hills north of Ulan Bator, is the tomb of Uchjulü-Chanuy (8 BC – AD 13), head of the Hun confederation.
 Scythian Kurgans tombs,  located in Almaty, Kazakhstan
 A kurgan near Melitopol was excavated and its assemblage included Scythian gold jewellery, which is not in the collection of the Melitopol Museum of Local History.

Kurgans in Poland

Kurgan building has a long history in Poland. The Polish word for kurgan is kopiec or kurhan. Some excavated kurgans in Poland:
 Burial mounds of the Unetice culture include fourteen kurgans dated to 2000–1800 BC
 Kraśnik Neolithic (Stone Age) kurhans
 Tombs at Pleśnik
 Trawiasta Buczyna — hundreds of stone kurhans dated to 1200–1000 BC
 Skalbmierz has kurgans dated 4000 BC.
 Zambrow
 Mounds at Jawczyce were described by Bishop Nankerus in 1322. Kurgan mounds dated to the Neolithic or Bronze Age included a burial of an elderly person, probably male. Some weapons and pottery fragments were also found in the tomb.
 Near  Sieradz a tomb dated to the Trzciniec culture of c. 1500 BC contains a man and woman buried together.
 A kurgan burial site at Łubna-Jakusy and a kurgan cremation near Guciów are examples of Trzciniec culture of c. 1500 BC.
 The Krakus Mound is located in Kraków. Legend says it is the burial place of Krakus, founder of the city.
 Wanda Mound, burial place of the daughter of Krakus, is located in Kraków.
  Piłakno near Mrągowo, excavated in 1988, is an example of west Baltic kurhan culture.
 In Bełchatow there is a pagan temple built upon a kurgan. Dating of this structure awaited results of carbon 14 tests in 2001.
 The mound called Kopiec Tatarski at Przemyśl is triangular in shape, 10 meters in length, and pointing east.  In 1869, T. Żebrawski found bones and ancient coins. In 1958, A. Kunysz found skulls and bones and medieval ceramics. a structure called Templum S. Leonardi was constructed around 1534 on top of the mound; it was destroyed in World War II.
 Kopiec Esterki was erected in the 14th century by Casimir III of Poland for his deceased wife.
 Burial tomb of Władysław III of Poland (died in 1444), part of the Memorial of the Battle of Varna built in 1924 in Varna, Bulgaria. The tomb was dug into an ancient Thracian kurgan (tumulus, burial mound).
 Kościuszko Mound in Kraków was completed in November 1823 as a memorial to Tadeusz Kościuszko
 The Union of Lublin Mound was completed in Lviv in 1980. Artificial mound in modern-day Ukraine.
 A Mound of Immortality was constructed to honor poet Adam Mickiewicz in 1898.
 Kopiec Wyzwolenia (Mound of Liberation) commemorates the 250th anniversary of the passage of the Polish Hussars through the city of Piekary Śląskie under John III Sobieski. It was completed in 1937.
 Piłsudski's Mound in Kraków honors Polish general and politician Józef Piłsudski.

See also 
 Animal sacrifice, Ashvamedha
 Kleczanów Forest
 Kurgan stelae
 Mamayev Kurgan, used during the Battle of Stalingrad.
 Newgrange
 Tarpan

References

Sources 

 Hugh Honour and John Fleming, A World History of Art, 1st edn. 1982 (many later editions), Macmillan, London, page refs to 1984 Macmillan 1st edn. paperback. 
 
 
 
 Piotrovsky, Boris, et al. "Excavations and Discoveries in Scythian Lands", in From the Lands of the Scythians: Ancient Treasures from the Museums of the U.S.S.R., 3000 B.C.–100 B.C. The Metropolitan Museum of Art Bulletin, v. 32, no. 5 (1974), available online as a series of PDFs (bottom of the page).

Further reading 
 "In Search of the Indo-Europeans: Language, Archaeology and Myth" by J. P. Mallory, 
 "The Kurgan Culture and the Indo-Europeanization of Europe: Selected Articles Form 1952 to 1993" von Marija Gimbutas u.a., 
 "Encyclopedia of Indo-European Culture" ed. James Mallory, D. Q. Adams, 
 D. Ya. Telegin et al., Srednestogovskaya i Novodanilovskaya Kul'tury Eneolita Azovo-Chernomorskogo Regiona. Kiev: Shlyakh, 2001. Reviewed by J.P. Mallory, JIES vol. 32, 3/4, p. 363–366.
 "Reconstruction Of The Genofond Peculiarities Of The Ancient Pazyryk Population (1st-2nd Millennium BC) From Gorny Altai According To The mtDNA Structure" Voevoda M.I., Sitnikova V.V., Romashchenko A.G., Chikisheva T.A., Polosmak N.V., Molodin V. I http://www.bionet.nsc.ru/bgrs/thesis/99/.
 O. Ismagulov 'Population of Kazakhstan from Bronze Epoch to Present (Paleoanthropological research)', Science, Alma-Ata, 1970

External links 

 Kurgan Culture 
 excavated kurgans  (archaeology.org).
 Ritual Sites, and Settlements: Eurasian Bronze and Iron Age book for download (www.csen.org)
 An extensive list of mounds in Poland

 
Archaeology of Central Asia
History of Ural
Turkic words and phrases